Ulf Lönnqvist (26 June 1936 – 24 June 2022) was a Swedish social democratic politician who held several government posts and was a member of the Swedish Parliament.

Biography
Lönnqvist was born in Malmö on 26 June 1936. He was a graduate of Lund University.

Following his graduation Lönnqvist moved to Tyresö to work at the department of chancellor. He served at the Parliament for the Social Democratic Party between 1985 and 1992. He was appointed minister of sports, youth and tourism in 1986 and remained in the post until 1989. As of 1986 he was also the state secretary at the Ministry of Agriculture under Svante Lundqvist. Lönnqvist was the minister of housing from 1988 to 1991. Between 1992 and 2001 he served as governor of Blekinge County.

Lönnqvist was married and had a daughter. He died on 24 June 2022.

References

1936 births
2022 deaths
Government ministers of Sweden
Lund University alumni
Members of the Riksdag 1985–1988
Members of the Riksdag 1988–1991
Members of the Riksdag 1991–1994
Members of the Riksdag from the Social Democrats
Politicians from Malmö
Swedish Ministers for Housing
Swedish Ministers for Nordic Cooperation